Hybristica was a solemn feast among the Greeks of ancient Argos, with sacrifices and other ceremonies, at which either sex appeared in the dress of the other to do honor to Aphrodite in quality of a god, a goddess, or both. The Hybristica was celebrated at Argos, upon the new moon of the month called by the Argives Hermeas, wherein the women being dressed like men insulted their husbands and treated them with every mark of inferiority, in memory of the Argian defence of their country made by the females under the conduct of Telesilla, against Cleomenes I and Demaratus at the head of the Spartan army. 

Plutarch observes that the word hybristica signifies infamy, and adds that it well became the occasion, the women strutting in cloaks, while the men dangled in petticoats.

References

This article incorporates text from the 1790 Bell's New pantheonarticle "Hybristica", a publication now in the public domain.

Ancient Argos
Festivals in ancient Greece
Cross-dressing
Observances on non-Gregorian calendars